The Fred A., May, and Ann Shogren House is a historic residence in Portland, Oregon, United States. For nearly 30 years, sisters May (1861–1928) and Ann (1868–1934) Shogren were the premier dressmakers and arbiters of women's fashion to the wealthy elite in Portland. They were also successful businesswomen, employing 50 to 100 seamstresses and producing enough surplus to invest in real estate. The sisters lived in this  Craftsman house, originally built for their brother Fred, from 1912, through retirement in 1918, and until their deaths. Their shop in downtown Portland and the sisters' investment properties are no longer extant, leaving this house as the most important remaining site related to their prominent careers. The Oregon Historical Society holds their business records and several of their dresses, gowns, and riding habits in its collections.

The house was entered on the National Register of Historic Places in 1989.

See also
National Register of Historic Places listings in Northeast Portland, Oregon

References

External links

Oregon Historic Sites Database entry

1906 establishments in Oregon
American Craftsman architecture in Oregon
Houses completed in 1906
Houses on the National Register of Historic Places in Portland, Oregon
North Tabor, Portland, Oregon
Portland Historic Landmarks